Sankt Georgen am Walde (also St. Georgen am Walde) is a municipality in the district of Perg in the Austrian state of Upper Austria.

Geography
Sankt Georgen lies in the Mühlviertel. About 52 percent of the municipality is forest, and 45 percent is farmland.

Population

References

Cities and towns in Perg District